Louise Haston (born 24 August 1980) is a Scottish paralympic tandem cyclist, piloting Aileen McGlynn.

Biography
Haston originally took part in athletics, but following a knee injury in 2009, decided to switch to cycling in 2009, through the gold4glasgow programme. Since then, she has gone on to represent Great Britain at a World Cup event and world championships, piloting a tandem with both Aileen McGlynn and Lora Turnham.

Haston represented Scotland at the Commonwealth Games, piloting McGlynn to win the silver medal in both tandem sprint and tandem kilo in Glasgow, 2014.

References

External links

1980 births
Paralympic cyclists of Great Britain
Cyclists at the 2014 Commonwealth Games
Living people
Commonwealth Games silver medallists for Scotland
Scottish female cyclists
Commonwealth Games medallists in cycling
Medallists at the 2014 Commonwealth Games